The Battle of Ghamra took place between Khalid ibn al-Walid and the remaining army of Buzakha, 20 miles from Buzakha.

On-line Resources
A.I. Akram, The Sword of Allah: Khalid bin al-Waleed, His Life and Campaigns Lahore, 1969

References

 A.I. Akram, The Sword of Allah: Khalid bin al-Waleed, His Life and Campaigns, Nat. Publishing. House, Rawalpindi (1970) .

Battles of Khalid ibn Walid
Battles involving the Rashidun Caliphate
Ridda Wars